James Render Dowdell (April 2, 1847 – June 21, 1921) was an American jurist and the 20th Chief Justice of the Alabama Supreme Court from 1909 to 1914.

Background and career
Dowdell was born in Chambers County, Alabama, the son of Congressman James Ferguson Dowdell.  He attended grammar school in LaFayette, Alabama and secondary school in Auburn, before attending the University of Alabama for two years.  He then attended East Alabama Male College, graduating in 1867.

While preparing for the bar exam, Dowdell taught school in LaFayette.  Upon his admission to the bar, Dowdell began to practice law in Opelika, Alabama in 1870 with William J. Samford. Dowdell was appointed solicitor of the Ninth Judicial Circuit in 1876, and judge of the Fifth Circuit in 1888.   In 1896, Dowdell was named chancellor of the Northeastern Division, and in 1898 was named an associate justice of the Alabama Supreme Court.

Dowdell was named by Governor Braxton Bragg Comer Chief Justice of the Alabama Supreme Court in 1909.  He served in that position until his resignation in 1914.  Dowdell returned to LaFayette until his death in 1921.

References

 Alabama Department of Archives and History. Alabama Supreme Court Chief Justices:  James R. Dowdell.   Accessed July 8, 2007.
 Alabama Dept. of Archives and History. Alabama Official and Statistical Register, 1907, 43.
 Intellectual Reserve, Inc., FamilySearch.org James Render Dowdell. Accessed July 8, 2007.

1847 births
1921 deaths
People from LaFayette, Alabama
Auburn University alumni
Auburn High School (Alabama) alumni
Chief Justices of the Supreme Court of Alabama
Justices of the Supreme Court of Alabama